Qualifying tournament to the 1971 CONCACAF Championship.

Caribbean zone

First round

Netherlands Antilles withdrew; Haiti advanced.

Second round
Cuba and Suriname refused to meet Haiti in the final triangular; CONCACAF decided to award the places in the final tournament to Haiti and Cuba.

Central American zone

First round

Second round

El Salvador withdrew due to Football War; Honduras advanced.

North American zone

References

CONCACAF Gold Cup qualification
qualification